Christian Samuel Weiss (26 February 1780 – 1 October 1856) was a German mineralogist born in Leipzig.

Following graduation, he worked as a physics instructor in Leipzig from 1803 until 1808. and in the meantime, conducted geological studies of mountain formations in Tyrol, Switzerland and France (1806–08). In 1810 he became a professor of mineralogy at the University of Berlin, where in 1818/19 and 1832/33, he served as university rector. He died near Eger in Bohemia.

Weiss is credited for creating parameters of modern crystallography, and was instrumental in making it a branch of mathematical science. He stressed the significance of direction in crystals, considering crystallographic axes to be a possible basis for classification of crystals. He is credited for introducing the categorization schema of crystal systems, and has a basic law of crystallography named after him called the "Weiss zone law".

Works by Weiss that have been translated into English 
 "On the methodical and natural distribution of the different systems of crystallisation" Edinburgh : Printed for A. Constable, 1823.
 "On the crystallographic discoveries and systems of Mohs and Weiss" (with Friedrich Mohs); Edinburgh : Printed for A. Constable, 1823.

References 
 Parts of this article are based on a translation of an equivalent article at the German Wikipedia.
 Historical atlas of crystallography by José Lima-de-Faria, Martin Julian Buerger

External links 
 University of Cambridge DoITPoMS Teaching and Learning Packages (Weiss zone law explained)

1780 births
1856 deaths
Scientists from Leipzig
People from the Electorate of Saxony
German mineralogists
Leipzig University alumni
Crystallographers
Science teachers
Recipients of the Pour le Mérite (civil class)